Bijoy TV (in reference to Victory Day) is a Bangladeshi Bengali-language privately owned satellite and cable television channel based in Banglamotor, Dhaka. This channel was established by former mayor of Chittagong A. B. M. Mohiuddin Chowdhury. Current Deputy Minister of Education Mohibul Hasan Chowdhury is one of the shareholders and is the former managing director of Bijoy TV.

History 
The channel originally began broadcasting illegally in the mid-2000s, but was later shut down in 2007 after order from the government. Later, in 2009, mayor of Chittagong A. B. M. Mohiuddin Chowdhury announced the relaunch of Bijoy TV.

It was then granted a broadcasting license by the Bangladesh Telecommunication Regulatory Commission alongside several other privately owned Bangladeshi television channels on 20 October 2009. The channel has started broadcasting regularly since 16 December 2011. The official transmission began on 31 May 2013. Bijoy TV began broadcasting on high-definition in 2015.

In July 2017, Bijoy TV, along with four other television channels in Bangladesh, signed an agreement with UNICEF to air children's programming for one minute. On 19 May 2019, Bijoy TV, along with five other channels, began broadcasting via the Bangabandhu-1 satellite after signing an agreement with BSCL. Bijoy TV unveiled a new logo on 31 May 2019.

References

External links 
 

Television channels in Bangladesh
Television channels and stations established in 2011
2011 establishments in Bangladesh
Mass media in Dhaka